Pitts and Todd were a comedy duo from the 1930s, put together by Hal Roach as the female counterpart to Laurel and Hardy. The duo consisted of actresses ZaSu Pitts and Thelma Todd. The team changed members over the years, becoming Todd and Kelly, then Kelly and Kelton, followed by Kelly and Roberti, then finally coming full circle with Pitts and Kelly.

History

Roach had previously paired Anita Garvin and Marion Byron together in 1928 and 1929 but only three films resulted. Both Pitts and Todd had been working with Roach in various short films and feature films previously.  The duo worked together for 17 short films.  Stan Laurel and Oliver Hardy made a guest appearance in Pitts and Todd's 1931 short On the Loose.  The 1930 Leroy Shield song "Beautiful Lady" was used as the theme song for the Pitts and Todd films.  The team's 1932 short film Show Business was directed by Jules White and was later re-worked as a Three Stooges Columbia short A Pain in the Pullman from 1936.

In mid-1933, ZaSu Pitts left the Hal Roach studios and Patsy Kelly was brought in as Thelma Todd's new partner.  This team filmed 21 more short films together until Todd's death in 1935.  The next pairing was Patsy Kelly and Pert Kelton for one short, and then Kelly and Lyda Roberti for two shorts and one feature film, Nobody's Baby.  Roberti died in 1938 at age 31.

In 1941, ZaSu Pitts and Patsy Kelly made their only appearance together in the feature film Broadway Limited.  The duo echo Laurel and Hardy in one sequence when sharing a bed with a baby and a leaking hot water bottle.

Filmography
All short subjects were released by Hal Roach Studios and MGM.

ZaSu Pitts and Thelma Todd

 Let’s Do Things (1931)
 Catch As Catch Can (1931)
 The Pajama Party (1931)
 War Mamas (1931)
 On the Loose (1931)
 Seal Skins (1932)
 Red Noses (1932)
 Strictly Unreliable (1932)
 The Old Bull (1932)
 Show Business (1932)
 Alum and Eve (1932)
 The Soilers (1932)
 Sneak Easily (1933)
 Asleep In the Feet (1933)
 Maids à la Mode (1933)
 Bargain of the Century (1933)
 One Track Minds (1933) (with Spanky McFarland)

Thelma Todd and Patsy Kelly

 Beauty and the Bus (1933)
 Backs to Nature (1933)
 Air Fright (1933)
 Babes in the Goods (1934)
 Soup and Fish (1934)
 Maid in Hollywood (1934)
 I'll Be Suing You (1934)
 Three Chumps Ahead (1934)
 One-Horse Farmers (1934)
 Opened By Mistake (1934)
 Done In Oil (1934)
 Bum Voyage (1934)
 Treasure Blues (1935)
 Sing Sister Sing (1935)
 The Tin Man (1935) 
 The Misses Stooge (1935)
 Slightly Static (1935)
 Twin Triplets (1935)
 Hot Money (1935)
 Top Flat (1935)
 An All-American Toothache (1936)

Patsy Kelly and Pert Kelton
 Pan Handlers (1936)

Patsy Kelly and Lyda Roberti
 Hill-Tillies (1936)
 At Sea Ashore (1936)
 Nobody's Baby (1937)

ZaSu Pitts and Patsy Kelly
 Broadway Limited (United Artists, 1941)

Notes

American comedy duos
American women comedians
Hal Roach Studios short film series